Mokresh may refer to:

 In Bulgaria (written in Cyrillic as Мокреш):
 Mokresh, Montana Province - a village in Valchedram municipality, Montana Province
 Mokresh, Shumen Province - a village in Veliki Preslav municipality, Shumen Province